Nkayi, Republic of the Congo
Nkayi, Zimbabwe
Nkayi District, Republic of the Congo
Nkayi District, Zimbabwe
Roman Catholic Diocese of Nkayi, Republic of the Congo